A Reckless Gamble is a 1928 British silent sports film directed by Widgey R. Newman and starring Desmond Roberts, Gladys Dunham and Wally Patch. It was released as a quota quickie. It is also known by the alternative title of Man in the Saddle.

Cast
 Desmond Roberts as Dick Beresford 
 Gladys Dunham as Eve Charteris  
 Wally Patch as Wally  
 Simeon Stuart as Sir Miles Wellington 
 Chubb Leach

References

Bibliography
Chibnall, Steve. Quota Quickies: The Birth of the British 'B' Film. British Film Institute, 2007.
 Murphy, Robert. Directors in British and Irish Cinema: A Reference Companion. British Film Institute, 2006.

External links
 

1928 films
1920s sports films
British horse racing films
British silent feature films
Films directed by Widgey R. Newman
British black-and-white films
Quota quickies
1920s English-language films
1920s British films
Silent sports films